Philip Stanton (born 1962) is an American artist and author based in Barcelona, Spain, director of the design group Stanton Studio, whose works include multimedia design projects and urban installations. He is also the author and illustrator of children's books published in Europe and the United States.

Biography

Barcelona
Since 1988 Stanton has participated in more than 60 solo and group exhibitions and has collaborated with newspapers and magazines (his covers for the cultural section of Barcelona newspaper La Vanguardia were awarded prizes by the ADGFAD and included in the 1992 European Illustration/Illustration Now annual), as well as with a number of Spanish and international companies.

His work has received a number of design and illustration awards in Spain including: 12 Laus awards, the Apel.les Mestres prize for children's literature and the Junceda illustration prize from the Catalan professional illustrator's association APIC. Internationally his work has won awards or been included for publication in the Cresta Awards, the British Design and Art Direction Annual, and the Type Directors Club annual.

Stanton is also head of the postgraduate illustration program and professor of illustration at the EINA Art & Design School in Barcelona.

Notable works
He is the author of a number of urban installations including: Palau Robert (1997–98), l'Aquàrium de Barcelona (1998), the inauguration ceremony of the European cup final (1999) in Barcelona, the set design of the internacional concert tour "Serrat-Tarrés" of Joan Manuel Serrat (2000), The construction wall during the building of the Agbar tower of architect Jean Nouvel (2001), the decoration of the Sagrada Família subway station (2002), the facade of PG45 (2006) and the parade floats of the holiday parade “Cabalgata de reyes” (2007) of the Barcelona city government.

Children's book author and illustrator
As an illustrator of books for children and adults he has published more than 40 titles including collaborations with authors Emili Teixidor, Jordi Sierra i Fabra, Ray Bradbury, Lee Bennett Hopkins, J. Patrick Lewis, Naguib Mahfouz, Juan Carlos Martín Ramos, Tomàs Garcés and Jorge Zentner. He is the author and illustrator of “La Gata Misha”, a series of children's books published in Spain by Grupo SM.

His work has been published and  translated into English, Spanish, French, Dutch, Catalan, and Italian.

Bibliography

Author and illustrator
 ¿Cómo te encuentras? Ed. Casterman, 1995, Spain
 Com et trobes? Ed. Casterman, 1995, Spain
 Comment te sents-tu? Ed. Casterman, 1995, France
 Hoe voel je je? Ed. Casterman, 1995, Holland
 ¿Sonidos o ruidos? Norma Editorial, 1995, Spain
 ¿Sons o sorolls? Norma Editorial, 1995, Spain
 Jolis sons ou villains bruits? Ed. Casterman, 1995, France
 Wat voor geluid maakt het? Ed. Casterman, 1995, Holland
 ¡No quiero ser violeta!  from the collection “Misha, la gata violeta” Grupo SM, 2006, Spain
 ¡Hoy no voy al cole!  from the collection “Misha, la gata violeta” Grupo SM, 2006, Spain
 Es mío, ¡devuélvemelo!  from the collection “Misha, la gata violeta” Grupo SM, 2006, Spain
 ¡No tengo sueño!  from the collection “Misha, la gata violeta” Grupo SM, 2006, Spain
 El dentista es un monstruo, from the collection “Misha, la gata violeta” Grupo SM, 2007, Spain
 Un hermano, ¿para qué?, from the collection “Misha, la gata violeta” Grupo SM, 2007, Spain
 No vull ser violeta! de la colección “Misha, la gateta violeta” Ed. Baula, 2009, España
 És meu, Torna-m’ho! de la colección “Misha, la gateta violeta” Ed. Baula, 2009, España
 Avui no aniré a l’escola! de la colección “Misha, la gateta violeta” Ed. Baula, 2009, España
 No Tinc Son! de la colección “Misha, la gateta violeta” Ed. Baula, 2009, España
 El dentista és un monstre! de la colección “Misha, la gateta violeta” Ed. Baula, 2009, España
 Un germanet, per a què? de la colección “Misha, la gateta violeta” Ed. Baula, 2009, España

Illustrator
 Barcelona, la ciudad de los niños. Ediciones Pau S.L., 1995, Spain
 Las noches de las mil y una noches. Círculo de Lectores, 1997, Spain
 Aigua. Consorci de l’Auditori i l’Orquestra, 2003, Spain
 Ring 1-2-3 y el mundo nuevo. Apel·les Mestres Prize Editorial Planeta, S.A., 2003, Spain
 En Ring 1-2-3 i el món nou. Apel·les Mestres Prize Editorial Planeta, S.A., 2003, Spain
 Cócteles Ilustrados. Blur ediciones, 2004, Spain
 Poemamundi. Grupo Anaya, 2004, Spain
 En Ring 1-2-3 i el món nou. (paperback) Planeta & Oxford, 2005, Spain
 Intercanvi. Perspectiva Editorial Cultural, S.A. - Aura Comunicació, 2005, Spain
 Got Geography!. Greenwillow Books, an imprint of HarperCollins, 2006, USA
 Cançó de Sega. Ed. Cruïlla, 2006, Spain
 En Ring 1-2-3 i la Lupa. Planeta & Oxford, 2007, Spain
 La Casa Vella. Editorial Planeta, 2007, Spain
 La Casa Vieja. Editorial Planeta, 2007, Spain
 Blind. Editorial Easy Readers, 2008, Dinamarca
 A la Tierra le ha salido una gotera. Grupo SM, 2008, España
 La Terra té una gotera. Grupo SM, 2008, España
 La cuina del Català de l´any. Editorial Primera Plana, 2008 España
 Chuf Chuf. Editorial Macmillan, 2009, España
 Txuf Txuf. Editorial Macmillan, 2009, España
 Gotas de colores. Editorial Satélite K, 2009, España
 Gotes de colors. Editorial Satélite K, 2009, España
 Josete y Bongo van de safari, 2010 Macmillan infantil. España

Covers and contributions
 Entre amigas. Ediciones Destino, 1999, Spain
 En la soledad del alba. Sopec Editorial, 1999, Spain
 Mis primeras 80.000 palabras. Media Vaca, 2002, Spain
 El topo a la luz del día. El Aleph, 2003, Spain

Honors and awards
 1984 Sullivan Scholarship, Rollins College
 1984 Orlando Advertising Foundation (OAF) Scholarship
 1985 Orlando Advertising Foundation (OAF) Scholarship
 1984 Who´s Who in American Colleges and Universities
 1985 Who´s Who in American Colleges and Universities
 1985 Albin C. Polasek Foundation Scholarship
 1985 Cornell Foundation Scholarship
 1985 Fishbach Foundation Scholarship
 1986 Scripps Howard Newspaper Foundation Scholarship
 1987 Fred C. Koch Foundation Scholarship
 1987 Winter Park Community Trust Fund Scholarship
 1987 MFA Leslie T. Posey Foundation Scholarship,
 1987 Award of Merit, CES Packaging Design Exposition, New York
 1989 British Design and Art Direction Annual, London
 1990 LAUS/ADGFAD Design Prizes: 3 bronze awards
 1990 European Illustration/Illustration Now Juried Annual, 8 pages selected
 1991 LAUS/ADGFAD Design Prizes: 1 silver award,2 bronzes
 1992 LAUS/ADGFAD Design Prizes: 1 silver award,
 1993 LAUS/ADGFAD Design Prizes: Trophy “Alimentario”
 1993 LAUS/ADGFAD Design Prizes: 1 silver award,1 bronze award
 1994 Cresta Awards: Finalist, New York
 1994 Typography 15, Type Director´s Club, New York
 1994 LAUS/ADGFAD Design Prizes: 1 silver award
 1995 LAUS/ADGFAD Design Prizes: 1 silver award
 1996 Barcelona City Government Design Prizes: 1 gold award
 1998 Centenary poster del Real Club de Tenis de Barcelona
 2001 poster for XX Aniversario de la "Setmana del Cava"
 2002 Finalist nacional Poster "Marc Martí"
 2002 Plata Premios "Best Pack"
 2003 XXIII Premio Destino Apel.les Mestres por “Ring 1-2-3 y el mundo nuevo”
 2005 Junceda Illustration Prizes APIC, Barcelona

Sources

References

Books
 Various authors.  "El pols dels dies. 125 anys de La Vanguardia,"  Daniel Giralt Miracle (author sección de ilustración), Barcelona: La Vanguardia, 2006. Pag. 106 y 107
 Ignasi Vich. "World’s sign selection," Barcelona: Index Book, 2002. Pag. 95, 107, 143
 Ramón Ubeda y Cristina Diaz. "Terminal B. Vol. I," Barcelona; FAD (Foment de les arts Decoratives), 2007. Pag. 360-361
 Daniel Giralt Miracle.  "Dibuixants, humoristes i il·lustradors de La Vanguardia 1881-2006,"  Barcelona: Fundació Caixa Girona, 2006. Pag. 147
 James Henry Mann Jr, Nicolas Lampert, Raquel Pelta, Nadxieli Mannello.  "Carteles contra una guerra. Signos por la paz,"  Barcelona: Editorial Gustavo Gili, 2003
 Various authors.  "Retrat de Barcelona. Vol II,"  Carles Prats (author sección de “Una Nova visió global”) Barcelona: Centre de Cultura Contemporània de Barcelona, 1995 Pag. 158-159
 Àngels Manzano, Ramón Úbeda, Maichael Bahr, Cristina Díaz.  "Pez de Plata. Barcelona. Ciudad, creación, color,"  Barcelona: BMW Ibérica, 2006. Pag. 68-69
 Various authors.  "Nessuno uniforme. Grafica contro la guerra,"  Milano: AIAP Assoziazione Italiana Progettazione per la Comunicazione Visiva, 2003. Pag. 19, 34 and 35.

Press
 Tomás Hornos. “Ilustrar una atmósfera, el tono, sugerir interpretaciones."   Artegráfica Nº 10 (febrero 2005), p. 6-22
 Carlos Díaz. “Stanton Studio. Creación sin etiquetas”.  Visual Nº 96 (2004) p. 116-122,
 Emili Teixidor. “Philip Stanton. Diario visual” Suplemento Culturas, La Vanguardia 21 June 2004, p. 12-13
 Antoni Mañach Moreno. “Philip Stanton”  Revista Codig nº 72 (2003) p. 6 – 11
 Richard Schweid. “An exuberant cubist”  Barcelona Metropolitan  nº 64 (mayo 2002). p. 12-14
 Philip Stanton. “Cuadernos de Bolonia”  CLIJ Cuadernos de Literatura Infantil y Juvenil Nº 18 (marzo 2005) p. 56-59
 Philip Stanton, “Autorretrato”  CLIJ Cuadernos de Literatura Infantil y Juvenil Nº 169 (marzo 2004) p. 41-43
 Ricardo Nuno, “Interview with Philip Stanton”, (on-line) Barceloca.com (July 19, 2002)

External links
 Stanton Studio website

1962 births
Living people
American male writers